Elections were held in the U.S. state of Arizona on November 3, 2020, as part of the 2020 General Election. Arizona voters chose 11 electors to represent them in the Electoral College via a popular vote.
Three seats on the Arizona Corporation Commission were up for election, as were all nine of Arizona seats in the United States House of Representatives, and one of its seats in the United States Senate. Primary elections were  held in August 2020. Paper ballots for voting by mail were sent to all registered voters in the state.

Federal offices

U.S. President

Arizona was represented by 11 electors in the electoral college. Joe Biden won the state with 49% of the popular vote. This was the first time a Democratic presidential candidate won Arizona since Bill Clinton in 1996.

U.S. Senate

A special election was held due to the death of Republican senator and presidential candidate John McCain.

Former U.S. senator Jon Kyl was originally appointed to the seat, but Kyl resigned on December 31, 2018. Outgoing U.S. Representative Martha McSally was then appointed to fill the seat following Kyl's resignation.

Democrat Mark Kelly defeated McSally, winning 51% of the vote.

U.S. House of Representatives

All nine of Arizona’s seats in the United States House of Representatives were up for election in 2020. Before the election, Republicans held 4 seats and Democrats 5. No districts changed hands, and thus Democrats maintained control.

State offices

Corporation Commission
Three seats on the Arizona Corporation Commission were up for election. Republican Bob Burns was term-limited and therefore ineligible to run for re-election to a third term in office.

Republican primary

Candidates
 Lea Márquez Peterson, incumbent. Appointed to replace Andy Tobin.
 Eric Sloan, candidate for the commission in 2018.
 James O'Connor, candidate for the commission in 2018 (nominated via write-in).

Not on the Ballot
 Avery Block
 Boyd Dunn, incumbent. Removed for insufficient signatures.
 Neil DeSanti
 Dave Farnsworth, state senator. Dropped out.
 Kim Owens, public relations executive. Removed for insufficient signatures.
 Patrick Tucker
 Nick Myers, legislative candidate in 2018.

Democratic primary

Candidates
 Bill Mundell, former Republican state representative and commissioner.
 Anna Tovar, Mayor of Tolleson, Arizona. Former state senator.
 Shea Stanfield

Not on the Ballot
 John Dougherty III
 Paul Newman, former commissioner.

General election

Polling
Each voter selected up to three candidates in the state Corporation Commission general election; with the top three vote-getters winning the seats. Consequently, poll results in the table immediately below are displayed as the accumulation of a candidate's first, second and third preferences and therefore sum to 300%, instead of 100%. Where a given percentage of voters are not decided with respect to multiple choices, that percentage is multiplied by the number of choices for which they are undecided (so, for instance, if 1% of voters had not picked any candidate, they would be listed in the table below as 3% of the total vote).

Results

Ballot initiatives

Two initiatives were approved for the General Election ballot.

Proposition 207

Proposition 207, the Smart and Safe Arizona Act, is to legalize and tax cannabis for adult use.

Polling

Proposition 208
Proposition 208, the Invest in Education Act, is to impose a 3.5% income tax surcharge on high earners and invest the revenue generated in education.

Polling

See also
 Elections in Arizona
 Bilingual elections requirement for Arizona (per Voting Rights Act Amendments of 2006)

Notes

Partisan clients

References

Further reading

External links
  (State affiliate of the U.S. League of Women Voters)
 
 
 
 
 
 Primary Candidates
 
 

Official campaign websites for Corporation Commission
 Bill Mundell (D) for Corporation Commission
 Lea Márquez Peterson (R) for Corporation Commission
 Eric Sloan (R) for Corporation Commission
 Shea Stanfield (D) for Corporation Commission 
 Anna Tovar (D) for Corporation Commission

 
Arizona